This page details statistics of CAF Confederation Cup.

General performances

By club

By nation

By semi-final appearances

Records and statistics
The following is a list of clubs that have played in the CAF Confederation Cup. The list is arrayed in order of number of clubs that reached the group stage.
489 clubs participated in the Confederation Cup (19 editions, as of 2022), 244 teams participated only once. 105 teams from 31 countries qualified to the group stage.

Group stage qualification

Teams in bold qualified for the knockout phase (2004-2008 for final, 2009-2016 for semi-finals, since 2017 for quarter-finals).

Participation and group stage qualification

Teams in bold qualified for the knockout phase (2004-2008 for final, 2009-2016 for semi-finals, since 2017 for quarter-finals).
Years marked with *: qualified from Champions League.

Records
Last updated after 2021-22 group stage Matchday 5
Most titles: 3
CS Sfaxien  in 2007, 2008, 2013

Teams winning on debut: 4
Étoile du Sahel  2006
CS Sfaxien  2007
Stade Malien  2009
FUS Rabat  2010

Successive title wins: 2
CS Sfaxien  2007, 2008
TP Mazembe  2016, 2017

Most appearances: 12
CS Sfaxien  (2007-2010, 2012, 2013, 2015, 2017, 2019, 2020, 2021, 2022)

Most consecutive appearances: 9
Al-Ahly Shendi  (2012-2020)

Most consecutive matches without losing: 13
Étoile du Sahel  recorded best undefeated streak through two seasons: 2006 (10 games) and 2008 (3 games)

Undefeated through whole season:
Étoile du Sahel  2006 in 10 games (8-2-0 record)

Most goals scored in a season: 34
SuperSport United  2017
Raja Casablanca  2018

Most goals conceded in a season: 25
105 Libreville  2005

Biggest win: 11 goals margin
US Bitam  - Desportivo de Guadalupe  12-1 (2 March 2013)

Biggest aggregate win: 16 goals margin
US Bitam  - Desportivo de Guadalupe  17-1 (0-5, 12-1; 17 February, 2 March 2013)

Most goals scored in a single game: 13
US Bitam  - Desportivo de Guadalupe  12-1 (2 March 2013)

Top goalscorer in a single season: 15
Abdelmalek Ziaya  2009

Group stage records
Most group stage appearances: 9
CS Sfaxien  (2007, 2008, 2010, 2013, 2015, 2017, 2019, 2021, 2022)

Most consecutive group stage appearances: 6
Étoile du Sahel  (2013-2016, 2019, 2021)

Most consecutive group stage appearances in successive editions: 5
RS Berkane  (2018-)

Most times advanced past group stage: 7
CS Sfaxien 

Most time advanced past group stage as group winners: 5
CS Sfaxien 

Most times eliminated in group stage: 3
Haras El Hodoud 
Interclube 
Djoliba AC 

Most times qualified to group stage but failed to go past it: 3
Haras El Hodoud 

Most group stage matches played: 54
CS Sfaxien 

Most group stage matches won: 25
CS Sfaxien 

Most appearances without group stage qualification: 7
Sahel SC 

Most teams from one nation/league: 21
 Nigeria Premier League;  10 teams qualified only once, eight teams managed to qualify to the group stage and four to the knockout stages.

Fewest teams from one nation/league: 0
No teams played in the competition from the following associations. The only leagues without Confederation Cup representative (2004-):
 Cape Verdean Football Championship
 Eritrean Premier League

Undefeated through group stage:
The following teams went undefeated through the group stage, with CS Sfaxien being the only team to achieve this feat three times.
FAR Rabat  2005 (5-1-0)
Dolphins  2005 (4-2-0)
Étoile du Sahel  2006 (6-0-0 joint record)
Maghreb de Fès  2011 (4-2-0)
Al-Merreikh  2012 (4-2-0)
CS Sfaxien  2013  (4-2-0), 2019 (3-3-0) and 2021 (2-4-0)
FUS Rabat  2016 (3-3-0)
TP Mazembe  2017 (3-3-0)
SuperSport United  2017 (2-4-0)
Al-Masry  2018 (3-3-0)
Horoya  2020 (4-2-0)
Zanaco  2020 (2-4-0)
Raja Casablanca  2021 (6-0-0 joint record)
JS Kabylie  2021 (3-3-0)

Winless in group stage:
The following teams went winless through the group stage with no teams doing it more than once.
Fello Star  2005 (0-0-6 joint record)
ASFAN  2010 (0-2-4)
Haras El Hodoud  2010 (0-3-3)
JS Kabylie  2011 (0-0-6 joint record)
Stade Malien  2012 (0-3-3)
ASEC  2014 (0-3-3)
CS Sfaxien 2015  (0-2-4)
Al-Ahli Tripoli  2016  (0-2-4)
Platinum Stars  2017 (0-3-3)
CF Mounana  2017 (0-0-6 joint record)
UD Songo  2018 (0-3-3)
Al-Hilal  2018 (0-3-3)
Salitas  2019 (0-4-2)
FC San Pédro  2020 (0-3-3)
FC Nouadhibou  2020 (0-2-4)
Bidvest Wits  2020 (0-2-4)
ESAE  2020 (0-1-5)
Namungo  2021 (0-0-6 joint record)
Coton Sport  2022 (0-3-3)
Royal Leopards  2022 (0-0-6 joint record)

All 6 wins in group stage:
Étoile du Sahel  2006
Raja Casablanca  2021

All 6 losses in group stage:
Fello Star  2005
JS Kabylie  2011
CF Mounana  2017
Namungo  2021
Royal Leopards  2022  

Most goals scored in group stage (single season): 15
Étoile du Sahel  2006
Orlando Pirates  2022

Most goals scored in group stage (total): 70
CS Sfaxien 

Most goals conceded in group stage (single season) 18:
Royal Leopards  2022

Most goals conceded in group stage (total): 39
Étoile du Sahel 

Fewest goals scored in group stage: 0
Namungo  2021, 0-9 goal difference

Fewest goals conceded in group stage: 0
Raja Casablanca  2021, 13-0 goal difference

Best goal difference in group stage: +13
Raja Casablanca  2021, 13-0 goal difference

Worst goal difference in group stage: -13
ESAE  2020, 1-14 goal difference
Royal Leopards  2022, 5-18 goal difference

Biggest win in a group stage match: 6 goals margin
Ismaily  - FC 105  6-0 (25 September 2005)
ES Sétif  - Santos  6-0 (28 August 2009)
Raja Casablanca  - Aduana Stars  6-0 (29 August 2018)
Pyramids  - FC Nouadhibou  6-0 (8 December 2019)

Most goals scored in a group stage match: 8
CF Mounana  - SuperSport United  3-5 (23 May 2017)
RS Berkane  - USGN  5-3 (13 February 2022)
Royal Leopards  - Orlando Pirates  2-6 (27 February 2022)

References

External links 
 http://www.cafonline.com/

CAF Confederation Cup
International club association football competition records and statistics